High Hat is a 1937 American film directed by Clifford Sanforth.

Plot
Swanee, the mentor and boyfriend of a classical singer, Elanda, who refuses to lower herself by singing swing music, until Swanee shows her the way.

Cast
 Frank Luther as Swanee Collier
 Dorothy Dare as Elanda Lee
 Lona Andre as Dixie Durkin
 Gavin Gordon as Gregory Dupont
 Franklin Pangborn as Renaldo Breton
 Esther Muir as Carmel Prevost
 Ferdinand Munier as Horatio Parker
 Robert Warwick as Craig Dupont Sr.
 Clarence Muse as Congo MacRosenbloom
 Harry Harvey as Nelson Connolly
 Jack Edwards, Jr. a.k.a. Sonny Edwards as Performer
 Sam Edwards a.k.a. Buddy Edwards as Performer
 Dolores Downey as Performer
 Peppy Downey as Performer
 Yvonne Downey as Performer
 Ted Dawson as Ted Dawson - Band Leader
 Ron Raymond as Performer
 Arnold Gray as Performer
 Kermit Holven as Performer
 Bruce Mitchell as Mug
 Fretta Shaw Singers as Singers
 Downey Sisters as Singing Trio

Soundtrack
 Clarence Muse and Fretta Shaw Singers - "I Go Congo" (Written by Clarence Muse)

References

External links
 
 

1937 films
American black-and-white films
Films based on American novels
1937 romantic comedy films
American romantic comedy films
1930s English-language films
Films directed by Clifford Sanforth
1930s American films